The Hoosier United Church is a municipal designated historic building located in the former hamlet of Hoosier in the Rural Municipality of Antelope Park, Saskatchewan, Canada.  The Gothic Revival wooden building was used for church services from 1916 until 1966 when it was repurposed as a community centre.  It remained in use as a community centre until the 1990s.

References 

Antelope Park No. 322, Saskatchewan
Churches completed in 1916
United Church of Canada churches in Saskatchewan
20th-century churches in Canada